

Lac du Vernex is a reservoir on the Saane/Sarine river at Rossinière, in the Pays d'Enhaut of the canton of Vaud.

See also
List of mountain lakes of Switzerland

External links
Swissdams: Rossinière

Reservoirs in Switzerland
Lakes of the canton of Vaud